Monticello Hotel may refer to:

Eldorado Hotel, Las Vegas, New Mexico, known briefly as the "Monticello Hotel", listed on the National Register of Historic Places
The Monticello Hotel, historic hotel in Norfolk, Virginia. Burnt down in 1918, rebuilt 1919 and operating until demolition in 1976
Monticello Hotel (Longview, Washington), hotel and apartment building, subject of an episode in Hotel Hell
"Monticello Hotel", episode 2 of season 2 of the TV series Hotel Hell

See also
Hyland Hotel (Monticello, Utah)